Aldo Pellegrini (Bologna, 28 August 1888 – Cartosio, 7 December 1940) was an Italian Air Force general during World War II.

Biography

He was born in Bologna on August 28, 1888, and enlisted in the Royal Italian Navy in 1908, entering the Royal Naval Academy of Livorno. He graduated with the rank of ensign in 1910, and in 1911-1912 he took part in the Italo-Turkish War. When the Kingdom of Italy entered World War I on May 24, 1915, he held the rank of lieutenant; having developed an towards aviation, he attended the Naval School of Aeronautics of Taranto, obtaining a license of seaplane pilot in June of the same year. During the war he held various positions and was in command of some squadrons of the Naval Air Auxiliary Service, distinguishing himself for courage and technical ability.

In the spring of 1917 he was in command of the 258th Squadron, equipped with FBA Type H aircraft, embarked on the seaplane carrier Europa, and in June of the same year he was transferred to the 253rd Squadron, of which he assumed command on the following 5 August. From 19 January 1918 he commanded the 264th Squadron stationed in Ancona, also equipped with FBA aircraft. On June 3, two Austro-Hungarian seamen of Italian origin decided to desert and stole a Lohner L seaplane, which they flew across the Adriatic Sea, landing near Fano, where they were captured; Pellegrini, along with sub-lieutenant Alberto Briganti, was sent from Ancona with the task of recovering the aircraft. By the end of the war he had been awarded two silver medals and one bronze medal for military valor.

In 1924, when he had reached the rank of lieutenant commander, he decided to join the newly established Regia Aeronautica. In March 1925 he was promoted to the rank of lieutenant colonel and in June 1926 he became Chief of Staff of the Minister of Aviation, holding that post until October 1929. In July 1927 he became a colonel and shortly after he took part in an inspection flight over the Mediterranean Sea, along with Italo Balbo and engineer Ettore Alberi, in preparation for Balbo's planned mass air cruises over the western and eastern Mediterranean, that would take place in 1928 and 1929. Pellegrini himself was chosen by Balbo as flying commander for he Eastern Mediterranean Air Cruise of 1929; this choice led to a final break-up between Balbo and Francesco De Pinedo, who expected to be chosen instead.

In September 1929 Pellegrini was promoted to the rank of air brigade general (equivalent to air commodore), and in May 1931, after the sudden death of Lieutenant Colonel Umberto Maddalena, he assumed the position of commander of the High-Seas Air Navigation School of Orbetello; in this capacity he collaborated in the realization of Balbo's Italy-Brazil air cruise (December 17, 1930 – January 15, 1931). Between 1 July and 12 August 1933 he took part, as deputy commander, in the Decennial Air Cruise, from Rome across the Atlantic to Chicago and New York organized by Minister of Aviation Balbo. On this occasion he personally flew a Savoia-Marchetti S.55X seaplane. Later in 1933 he replaced Manlio Molfese as head of division at the head of the Civil Aviation Directorate of the Ministry of Air Force (Civilavia).

In view of Italy's entry into World War II, on 16 May 1940 he assumed the position of commander of the 3rd Air Fleet, with headquarters in Rome. After the  signing of the armistice of Villa Incisa with France, on June 26 he assumed the position of Vice-President of the Italian Armistice Commission with France (Commissione Italiana di Armistizio con la Francia, CIAF).

On 28 June he participated in the first meeting of the Armistice Commission, in which sub-commissions were created to deal with general issues and issues relating to the French army, navy and air force. On July 20, 1940, he was elevated to the rank of air fleet general (equivalent to air marshal). On 7 December 1940 he took off from Rome aboard a Savoia-Marchetti S.79 together with General Pietro Pintor, to reach the CIAF headquarters of in Turin, but the plane crashed in Cartosio, on the border between the provinces of Savona and Alessandria, killing everyone aboard.

References

1888 births
1940 deaths
Italian generals
Italian Air Force generals
Italian aviators
Italian military personnel of World War II
Italian military personnel of World War I
Italian military personnel of the Italo-Turkish War
Italian military personnel killed in World War II
Recipients of the Bronze Medal of Military Valor
Recipients of the Silver Medal of Military Valor
Military personnel from Bologna
Victims of aviation accidents or incidents in Italy
Victims of aviation accidents or incidents in 1940